Teofila Bogumiła Glińska (died 1799) was a Polish poet. She published poems in the style of the Enlightenment; they are regarded as having been among the first poems in Poland written in the Romantic sentimentalist style.

Works
 Szczorse, powst. w sierpniu 1784, wyd. J. Chreptowicz, „Magazyn Warszawski” 1785, t. 1, cz. 1, s. 91-93; wyd. następne oprac. T. Mikulski, „Pamiętnik Literacki”, rocznik 41 (1950), zeszyt 3/4, przedr. w: Ze studiów nad Oświeceniem, Warszawa 1956.
 Hymn Peruanów o śmierci. Z prozy Inkasów pana Marmontela wyjęty i na wiersz przełożony, wyd. J. Chreptowicz, „Magazyn Warszawski” 1785, t. 1, cz. 1, s. 99-103; wyd. następne oprac. T. Mikulski, „Pamiętnik Literacki”, rocznik 41 (1950), zeszyt 3/4, przedr. w: Ze studiów nad Oświeceniem, Warszawa 1956.
 Bukiet od córki dla matki w dzień imienin tejże, powst. przed rokiem 1790, z rękopisu: Życie Ignacego Bykowskiego, porucznika wojsk rosyjskich, przez niego samego napisane w roku 1808, wyd. i przedr. T. Mikulski, „Pamiętnik Literacki”, rocznik 41 (1950), zeszyt 3/4, przedr. w: Ze studiów nad Oświeceniem, Warszawa 1956.
 Od tejże, w wilią rocznicy ojca, powst. przed rokiem 1790, z rękopisu wyd. i przedr. T. Mikulski, „Pamiętnik Literacki”, rocznik 41 (1950), zeszyt 3/4, przedr. w: Ze studiów nad Oświeceniem, Warszawa 1956.
 Wiersze imć panny Glińskiej na obraz j. o. księżny Massalskiej, hetmanowy W. Ks. Lit., przez imci p. Szmuglewicza malowany... w Wilnie. Myśli na ustroniu, odpisy rękopiśmienne z XVIII wieku w Bibliotece Jagiellońskiej, sygn. 6214/III.

References

 T. 4: Oświecenie. W: Bibliografia Literatury Polskiej – Nowy Korbut. Warszawa: Państwowy Instytut Wydawniczy, 1966, s. 469-470.

18th-century Polish–Lithuanian poets
Polish women poets
1760s births
1799 deaths
18th-century Polish–Lithuanian women writers